Mises or von Mises may refer to:
 Ludwig von Mises, an Austrian-American economist of the Austrian School, older brother of Richard von Mises
 Mises Institute, or the Ludwig von Mises Institute for Austrian Economics, named after Ludwig von Mises 
 Richard von Mises, an Austrian-American scientist and mathematician, younger brother of Ludwig von Mises
 Von Mises distribution, named after Richard von Mises
 Von Mises yield criterion, named after Richard von Mises
 Dr. Mises, pseudonym of Gustav Fechner, a German philosopher, physicist and experimental psychologist.

Jewish surnames
Austrian noble families